Gruver may refer to:

 Gruver, Iowa
 Gruver, Texas
 Nancy Gruver (d. 1990), American bridge player